The North Branch River is an  river in southeastern New Hampshire in the United States. It is a tributary of the Lamprey River, part of the Great Bay and Piscataqua River watershed leading to the Atlantic Ocean.

The river begins in Bear Brook State Park, in Deerfield, New Hampshire, at the outlet to Beaver Pond. Flowing southeast, it quickly leaves the park, then enters the town of Candia. It passes under New Hampshire Route 43 just south of the village of Candia, then reaches NH 27 just before entering the town of Raymond, where the river ends at the Lamprey River.

See also

List of rivers of New Hampshire

References

Rivers of New Hampshire
Rivers of Rockingham County, New Hampshire